Janiszewice  is a village in the administrative district of Gmina Zduńska Wola, within Zduńska Wola County, Łódź Voivodeship, in central Poland.

During the German occupation of Poland (World War II), the Germans operated a Nazi prison in Janiszewice that was subordinate to the prison in Sieradz.

References

Janiszewice